John Robert Candelaria (born November 6, 1953) is a retired Major League Baseball pitcher.  Nicknamed "The Candy Man", he played in MLB during the years 1975–1993 for eight teams, the Pittsburgh Pirates, California Angels, New York Mets, New York Yankees, Montreal Expos, Minnesota Twins, Toronto Blue Jays, and the Los Angeles Dodgers.

Early life 
Candelaria was born on November 6, 1953, to Puerto Rican parents. He is the second of four children born to John and Felicia Candelaria. He  grew up in the Flatbush section of Brooklyn, New York. He frequently attended New York Yankees games at Yankee Stadium.

Career 
At the age of 15, Candelaria attended a baseball tryout where a Los Angeles Dodgers scout called him the best he had ever seen. The tryout catcher had to be replaced with a major league catcher for fear of injuring the stand-in.

Candelaria played as a center in the Baloncesto Superior Nacional (BSN), the top tier basketball league in the Puerto Rico, for 2 seasons with the Piratas de Quebradillas in 1971 and 1972. When he announced he was leaving the Quebradillas basketball "Pirates" for the Pittsburgh Pirates, many were skeptical. The local newspaper featured him pitching a basketball on the front page of the sports section. He had attended La Salle Academy in lower Manhattan and gained fame as a basketball center, including leading his team to a championship in 1971.

Candelaria had his best season in 1977, when he was 20–5 with a 2.34 ERA in  innings pitched.  He was also a member of the 1979 World Series champion Pirates team.  On August 9, 1976, Candelaria no-hit the Los Angeles Dodgers 2–0 at Three Rivers Stadium; it was the first no-hitter pitched by a Pirate in Pittsburgh since Nick Maddox at Exposition Park in 1907. Candelaria's second post-season appearance with the Pirates (he pitched Game 3 in the 1975 NLCS) came in their 1979 World Series championship season. Candelaria started Game 1 of the 1979 NLCS and pitched seven innings of two-run ball against the Reds with a painful shoulder. The Pirates won 5–2 in 11 innings. In the 1979 World Series, Candelaria had a rough Game 3, giving up five runs in 4 innings as the Pirates lost 8–4 to the Orioles. He redeemed himself in a crucial Game 6 by combining with Kent Tekulve to pitch a 4–0 shutout.

He suffered personal tragedy on Christmas morning 1984, when his 18-month-old son John Jr. fell into the family's swimming pool at their home in Sarasota, Florida. John Jr. spent five weeks in intensive care and was then transitioned to home, where he received nursing care 24 hours per day. He was readmitted to the hospital multiple times and spent 11 months in a coma. John Jr. died in a Pittsburgh hospital on November 14, 1985.

Candelaria was moved to the bullpen in 1985. In response to the change, Candelaria called general manager Harding Peterson "a bozo"; he said that the team's ownership valued its racehorses more than its baseball players. He posted nine saves out of the Pittsburgh bullpen, which ended up being a team high on a 57-win team. He was traded along with George Hendrick and Al Holland from the Pirates to the Angels for Pat Clements and Mike Brown on August 2 in a transaction that was completed two weeks later on August 16 when Bob Kipper was sent to Pittsburgh. At the time, he was one of only two Pirates that remained from the 1979 championship team, the other being Don Robinson. The Angels immediately made him a starter again and he went 7–3 down the stretch in 1985 and helped the Angels into the 1986 ALCS with a 10–2 record. Candelaria later said that the trade to a contending team had been a positive change for him.

Candelaria and George Hendrick once confronted their Angels teammate Reggie Jackson about his bullying of Lisa Nehus Saxon. Saxon had been one of the first female reporters allowed in baseball locker rooms.

In 1989, Yankee manager Dallas Green looked to give Candelaria some extra rest at the start of the year, as the pitcher was recovering from a knee injury.

Candelaria played for both New York teams (Mets and Yankees), both Los Angeles teams (Dodgers and Angels) and both Canadian teams (Blue Jays and Expos). He finished his career back where it started in Pittsburgh in 1993, making him the only Pirates player from the 1979 team to play for the Pirates during their twenty consecutive losing seasons.

Tommy John remembered that Candelaria would throw strikes on 0-2 pitches, rather than wasting a pitch outside of the strike zone. "He gave up some 0-2 hits, but got more 0-2 outs, and saved his arm some pitches."

Personal life
Candelaria currently lives in North Carolina, and is an avid world traveler. John has a nephew, Zac Candelaria, who played catcher at the Division One program of Fairfield University.

See also
 List of Major League Baseball annual ERA leaders
 List of Major League Baseball no-hitters

References

External links

Biography

1953 births
Living people
American expatriate baseball players in Canada
American sportspeople of Puerto Rican descent
Baloncesto Superior Nacional players
California Angels players
Charleston Charlies players
Charleston Pirates players
Gulf Coast Yankees players
Pittsburgh Pirates players
Los Angeles Dodgers players
Major League Baseball pitchers
Minnesota Twins players
Montreal Expos players
National League All-Stars
National League ERA champions
New York Mets players
New York Yankees players
Palm Springs Angels players
Piratas de Quebradillas players
Salem Pirates players
Senadores de San Juan players
Sportspeople from Brooklyn
Baseball players from New York City
Toronto Blue Jays players